Jonathan Green may refer to:

Jonathan Green (journalist), English journalist and author
Jonathan Green (medical writer) (1788–1864), naval surgeon, dermatologist
Jonathan Green (photographer), American photographer and writer
Jonathan Green (psychiatrist), professor of child and adolescent psychiatry
Jonathan Green (speculative fiction writer), British writer of fantasy and science fiction
Jonathan H. Green (1813–1887), American gambler, inventor, writer and later reformer
Jonathan Smith Green (1796–1878), missionary from New England to Hawaii
Jonathan D. Green, American musicologist, composer, and academic administrator
Jonathan Green, mayor of Lone Tree, Iowa
Jonathan Green, writer for the U.S. TV series The Cleveland Show

See also
Jonathan Green House, a historic house in Stoneham, Massachusetts
Jonathon Green (born 1948), British lexicographer
John Green (disambiguation)